The Eagle's Feather is a 1923 American silent Western film directed by Edward Sloman and starring James Kirkwood and Mary Alden. It was produced and distributed by Metro Pictures.

Cast

Preservation status
A copy of The Eagle's Feather is held in the Gosfilmofond Archive.

References

External links

 
 
 Stills at silentfilmstillarchive.com

1923 films
1923 Western (genre) films
1920s romance films
American black-and-white films
American romance films
Films based on works by Katharine Newlin Burt
Films directed by Edward Sloman
Metro Pictures films
Silent American Western (genre) films
1920s American films
1920s English-language films